Carabus planicollis verae is a subspecies of ground beetle in the subfamily Carabinae that is endemic to Romania.

References

planicollis verae
Beetles described in 1905
Endemic fauna of Romania
Taxa named by Ernő Csíki